Cydalise et le chèvre-pied ("Cydalise and the goat-foot" or "Cydalise and the satyr") is a two-act ballet originally choreographed by Léo Staats to a score by Gabriel Pierné. The libretto was written by Gaston Arman de Caillavet and Robert de Flers, based on Remy de Gourmont's Lettre d'un satyre. Though it was composed between 1914 and 14 February 1915, its Paris Opera premiere was delayed due to the conditions of World War I until 15 January 1923. The use of the French term "chèvre-pied" (goat foot) to refer to the satyr is distinct to this composition.

The ballet remains one of the Pierné's most popular compositions. The music is of the impressionist era, though it contains elements of Romanticism, Neoclassicism, and Neo-Baroque music.  Three years after the premiere Pierné extracted two suites from the work, the first of which includes sections from the first two tableaux while the second comprises the entire third tableau. One of the most recognizable pieces in the ballet, "L'École des Ægipans," also known as "The Entry of the Little Fauns" or "The March of the Fauns," is occasionally excerpted and performed separately.

The music

Structure

Act I
Tableau I
Introduction
Danse des Dryades
Apparition de la Source
L'École des Ægipans
La Leçon de flûte de Pan
L'École des Nymphes
La Leçon de danse
Scène
Styrax

Act II
Tableau II
Entrée des Danseurs
Entrée de Styrax
Entrée de Cydalise
Ballet La Sultane des Indes
Entrée
Pantomime
Pas des Apothicaires
Danse des Esclaves
Variations de Cydalise
Final du Ballet
Danse de Styrax

Tableau III
Entrée de Cydalise
Entrée des Suivantes
Pas des billets doux
Entrée de Styrax et danse
Final

Style and influences
Cydalise et le Chèvre-pied makes use of modes and lush harmonies characteristic of impressionist music.  The opening moonrise scene, highlighted by a wordless chorus, uses techniques similar to that of Maurice Ravel's Daphnis et Chloé (1912).  Cydalise, however, differs in its adherence to shorter musical numbers and closed form composition. The ballet also references styles customary to the Classical and Baroque musical eras, employing a magnified woodwind section emphasizing flutes and piccolos, and even a contemporaneously uncommon use of the harpsichord in Act II.

Discography
1976: Orchestra suites no. 1 and 2 (+ Ramuntcho), performed by the Paris Opera,  Jean-Baptiste Mari (dir.) - EMI Classics.
2001: Cydalise et le Chèvre-pied, performed by the Luxembourg Philharmonic Orchestra, David Shallon (dir.) - Timpani Records.

In popular culture
Cydalise et le Chèvre-pied was among Toccata and Fugue in D minor, Nutcracker Suite, Night on Bald Mountain, Ave Maria, Dance of the Hours, Clair de Lune, The Rite of Spring, and The Sorcerer's Apprentice as the original planned line-up for Walt Disney's Fantasia (1940).  However, both it and Clair de Lune were removed from the program late in the writing process and Cydalise et le Chèvre-pied was ultimately replaced with sections from Ludwig van Beethoven's Pastoral Symphony.

References

Sources
 

Compositions by Gabriel Pierné
1915 compositions
1923 ballet premieres
Ballets premiered at the Paris Opera Ballet
Compositions for symphony orchestra